Robert Edward Huggins (born September 21, 1953) is an American college basketball coach. Nicknamed “Huggy Bear,” he is currently the head coach of the West Virginia Mountaineers men's basketball team. Huggins previously held the head coaching positions at Walsh College (1980–1983), the University of Akron (1984–1989), the University of Cincinnati (1989–2005) and Kansas State University (2006–2007).
He was inducted into the Naismith Memorial Basketball Hall of Fame in 2022. Huggins is currently the winningest active head coach in NCAA D-I basketball.

One of only six coaches ever with 900 or more career victories. Huggins has been to 24 total NCAA tournaments, including 23 in the last 26 seasons. He has led his teams to nine Sweet Sixteen appearances, four Elite Eight appearances (3 at Cincinnati and 1 at West Virginia University), and two Final Four appearances (1992 with Cincinnati and 2010 with West Virginia). Huggins has also has lost in the first two rounds of the NCAA Tournament a total of 16 times. As of March 2021, Huggins has averaged 23 wins per season over the course of his career. He is also the second coach to win 300 games at two schools.

Playing career
Huggins, who had moved from Morgantown, West Virginia to Port Washington, Ohio, with his family, played basketball for his father, Charles, at Indian Valley South High School. As a senior, he helped lead his team to a 26–0 season.

Huggins began college at Ohio University. After his freshman season he transferred to his native West Virginia. He played point guard for the Mountaineers from 1975 until 1977 under head coach Joedy Gardner. His career-high was 28 points against Virginia Tech. He averaged 13.2 points as a senior and totaled 800 career points in his three collegiate seasons.

He graduated from WVU magna cum laude (the highest latinate honor for academic grades then bestowed by WVU) with a double major in education and physical therapy.

Cut after a 1977 tryout with the NBA's Philadelphia 76ers, Huggins subsequently pursued a Master's degree in health administration at his alma mater, West Virginia University.

Coaching career

Early coaching career
Huggins began his coaching career as a graduate assistant at West Virginia under Gardner in 1977. He then spent two years as an assistant to Eldon Miller at Ohio State University. Huggins was only 27 when he became a collegiate head coach at Walsh University in 1980. In three seasons at Walsh, he compiled a 71–26 record, twice earning NAIA District 22 Coach of the Year honors. Huggins directed the Walsh 1982–83 team to a perfect 30–0 regular season mark and an eventual 34–1 mark. After serving as an assistant at University of Central Florida for the 1983–84 season, Huggins was named head coach of the University of Akron. Huggins compiled a 97–46 record and reached post-season play in three of his five seasons at Akron, including an NCAA bid in 1985–86 season.

Cincinnati
Cincinnati, while having a rich history, had fallen on hard times. Cincinnati appeared in 5 consecutive Final Fours from 1959 to 1963—and won the national championship in 1961 and 1962. By 1989, when Huggins was hired, though, the Bearcats had not earned a bid to the NCAA tournament since 1977. Even worse, Cincinnati had only one winning conference record in those 12 previous seasons. The Bearcats were invited to the NIT his first two years and then advanced all the way to the Final Four of the NCAA tournament in 1992, Huggins' third season as coach.

Overall, Huggins compiled a 399–127 record (.759) in his 16 years at Cincinnati, making him the winningest basketball coach in the school's history. Huggins directed Cincinnati to ten conference regular-season titles and eight league tournament titles. The Bearcats appeared in post-season play in each of Huggins' 16 seasons. Besides the aforementioned Final Four appearance in 1992, they advanced to the Elite Eight of the NCAA tournament two other times, in 1993 and 1996.

Huggins earned the Ray Meyer Award as the Conference USA Coach of the Year a record three times (1997–98, 1998–99, and 1999–2000), and was a unanimous choice for C-USA Coach of the Decade. He was selected national coach of the year by ESPN.com in 2001–02. His teams won five consecutive conference tournament titles—all four Great Midwest Conference titles from 1992 to 1995 and the first Conference USA men's basketball tournament in 1996. He was named co-national coach of the year by The Sporting News and was Basketball Times' national coach of the year in 1997–98. He earned national coach of the year recognition from Hoop Scoop in 1991–92 and Playboy in 1992–93.

During his tenure, Huggins coached three consensus All-Americans: Danny Fortson, Kenyon Martin (the consensus player of the year in 1999–2000) and Steve Logan.

In 1997–98, Huggins directed a team which had only one returning starter to a 27–6 record, the Conference USA regular season and tournament titles, a No. 2 seed in the NCAA tournament and a Top-10 finish in the polls. The team was then upset in the Round of 32 by West Virginia in the NCAA tournament. Huggins' 2001–02 team, unranked when the season began, posted a 31–4 record, setting a school record for wins, made a clean sweep of the Conference USA regular season and tournament titles, and was a No. 1 seed in the NCAA tournament, where they lost in double overtime to No 8 seed UCLA in the second round. In 2002–03, Huggins suffered a major heart attack on the last Saturday of September, but was present for the team's first practice two weeks later. The team qualified for the NCAA tournament as an 8 seed, and was ousted in the first round by Gonzaga.

In the 2003–04, Huggins piloted the Bearcats to regular-season and tournament titles, and an NCAA tournament berth while amassing a 25–7 record. Despite a favorable draw—the team was sent to nearby Columbus for the first two rounds of the tournament—the Bearcats were defeated by the Illinois Fighting Illini in the second round, losing by 24 points. The 2004–05 Bearcats posted a 25–8 ledger, the ninth season in the previous 10 that the Bearcats had won at least 25 games. They received a 7 seed in the tournament and lost to eventual Elite Eight participant Kentucky in the second round at the RCA Dome in nearby Indianapolis.

Resignation
On August 23, 2005, UC President Nancy L. Zimpher gave Huggins an ultimatum: resign and take a $3 million buyout, or be reassigned outside the athletic department for the balance of his contract. Had Huggins not responded within 24 hours, he would have been fired. Huggins had untruthfully told the press he didn't know about the ultimatum until numerous reporters called him in Las Vegas. However, multiple letters between UC and Huggins' attorney showed that Huggins knew he would not be returning for a 17th season, and that both parties been negotiating the terms of his departure. The correspondence also showed that Huggins had known weeks in advance that his ouster was imminent. He ultimately agreed to accept the $3 million buyout.

Zimpher said that the Bearcat program under Huggins didn't fit with her plan to upgrade UC's academic reputation. However, she'd been seriously considering ousting Huggins since he was arrested for driving under the influence in 2004. He ultimately pleaded no contest to DUI.

According to The Wall Street Journal, Zimpher was particularly upset that news of the arrest broke on the morning of her first commencement as UC's president, at which Coretta Scott King was due to be the speaker. Huggins didn't help his image with Zimpher when an assistant coach, two players and a recruit were arrested in the spring of 2005.

At the time, Huggins' contract had a rollover clause which added a year every summer. Zimpher revoked that clause on June 11, 2004, after his no-contest plea, but allowed Huggins to return for the 2004–05 basketball season. On May 11, 2005, he was given the option of leaving or finishing the last two years remaining on his contract. In a May 16, 2005 press conference, Huggins announced that he was staying until his contract expired on June 30, 2007, thus agreeing to the terms originally offered to him by UC.

Huggins was replaced by assistant head coach Andy Kennedy.

Kansas State
After spending a year out of the coaching profession, on March 23, 2006, Huggins accepted the head coaching job at Kansas State University, replacing the fired Jim Wooldridge. The Wildcats had not been to the NCAA tournament since the 1995–1996 campaign and had not had a conference record better than 7–9 since the Big 12 Conference was formed in 1996. The previous three Kansas State basketball coaches (Dana Altman, Tom Asbury, and Wooldridge) had combined for a 236–232 record. In his sole season at Kansas State, Huggins coached the Wildcats to a 23–12 overall record, and a 10–6 Big 12 record. The Wildcats were not invited to the NCAA tournament but accepted an NIT bid and won one game.

Some of Huggins' recruiting targets included consensus top 10 players in O. J. Mayo, Bill Walker, as well as consensus top 100 recruits such as Herb Pope, Ramar Smith, and Jason Bennett. While Mayo, Pope, and Smith all ended up at other schools, Huggins was able to bring in Bennett for the 2006–07 season and Walker—initially slated to join the team for the 2007–08 season, managed to graduate from North College Hill High School early to participate in time for the spring semester. Huggins' second recruiting class was rated even better. The key recruit was consensus top 5 player Michael Beasley out of the Washington, D.C. area. Other recruits in the 2007 class included Walker, Dominique Sutton—a 6'4" swingman out of Durham, North Carolina--Jacob Pullen—a 6'1" point guard from Proviso East High School— and Fred Brown, a 6'2" shooting guard from West Palm Beach, Florida.

In addition to the Huggins' recruits, Kansas State had returned 4 of its top 5 scorers including 2nd team All-Big 12 Conference member Cartier Martin and Honorable All-Big 12 member David Hoskins. The 2005–06 team had been involved in many close games, going 7–9 in games decided by 5 points or less during the season. The Wildcats were picked to finish as high as 5th in the Big 12,. Prior to that season, Kansas State had never finished higher than 7th place in the Big 12. The early part of the season got off to a rocky start as the Wildcats started the year 4–3 which included losses to the New Mexico Lobos and California Golden Bears by a combined 54 points. The Wildcats would ultimately benefit from the eligibility of Bill Walker and won six straight games, including a tournament victory in the Las Vegas Holiday Classic. The Wildcats would soon hit another rough patch as they lost three straight games to Xavier, Texas A&M and Texas Tech. Even more damaging was the loss of star freshman Bill Walker when he tore his ACL five minutes into a 69–65 loss to Texas A&M. After the Walker injury, seniors Martin, Lance Harris and Akeem Wright stepped up their game and led Kansas State to a 7-game winning streak which included a win over the ranked Texas Longhorns in Austin that broke a 22-game Texas home winning streak. The 2nd half of Big 12 play saw the Wildcats go 4–4 including a pair of losses to its in-state rival the Kansas Jayhawks. Kansas State ended the Big 12 season in the semifinals of the Big 12 tournament losing to Kansas for a third time, but did pick up a crucial 66–45 win over Texas Tech. The Wildcats received a NIT bid and went 1–1 beating Vermont and losing to DePaul. Kansas State ended the season 23–12 (10–6)--the most victories from a Wildcat team since 1987–1988, a year that saw them lose to the Kansas Jayhawks in the Elite Eight of the 1988 NCAA tournament.

West Virginia

On April 5, 2007, Huggins announced that he had accepted the position of head coach at his alma mater, West Virginia University. Huggins succeeded John Beilein who left to fill the same position with the Michigan Wolverines.
Only nine games into the 2007–2008 season, the Mountaineers entered the AP Top 25 poll carrying a #24 ranking with an 8–1 record. On December 22, 2007, Huggins achieved his 600th victory as a head coach in a road game at Canisius. The Mountaineers finished the regular season with an 83–74 overtime victory over St. John's, then opened the Big East tournament with a 58–53 victory over Providence. In the second round of the tourney, the Mountaineers upset the #15-ranked Connecticut Huskies, 78–72. Joe Alexander contributed with a career-high 34 points and 7 rebounds. The Mountaineers then lost to the #9 Georgetown Hoyas, 55–72, in the tourney semifinals.

The showing by WVU in the Big East tourney propelled them into the West region of the NCAA tournament as a #7-seed. The Mountaineers defeated Arizona in the first round 75–65 and defeated #2-Seed Duke 73–67 to move into the Sweet Sixteen giving Huggins his first Sweet Sixteen appearance since 2001 when he coached at Cincinnati. In the Sweet 16 matchup against #3-seed Xavier, the Mountaineers rallied from an 18-point deficit early in the game to tie the game 64–64 and send it into overtime. However, the Xavier Musketeers pulled out the victory, 79–75, with two 3-pointers in the last 1:18 of the ballgame. West Virginia finished the season ranked  #17 in the AP poll. At the end of just his first season at West Virginia, Huggins signed an 11-year contract extension that would keep him coaching at West Virginia until the age of 65.

On May 18, 2008, Huggins completed his recruiting class with the signing of small forward, Devin Ebanks. The #13-ranked prospect had signed with Indiana before decommitting and looking at Memphis, Texas, Rutgers and WVU. Ebanks was the last addition to the freshman class that included #11-power forward Kevin Jones, #34-power forward Roscoe Davis and #26-point guard Darryl Bryant.

West Virginia began the 2008–09 season 4–0, led by senior Alex Ruoff, junior Da'Sean Butler and a freshman class highlighted by Devin Ebanks and Darryl Bryant. After wins over Delaware State and Iowa, they lost the Las Vegas Invitational tournament championship game to Kentucky 54–43, but then bounced back with two wins to move to 6–1. However, they lost a last-second game to #22 Davidson and Stephen Curry in Madison Square Garden, 68–65. Following the loss, WVU posted five straight victories; this streak included a 76–48 win over #13 Ohio State in Columbus, snapping the Buckeyes' 14-game win streak and handing OSU their biggest home loss since 1998. However, the streak ended in a 61–55 loss to #5 Connecticut which was followed by a 75–53 loss to #15 Marquette. The Mountaineers bounced back with a three-game win streak that included a 75–58 victory over #14 Georgetown in Washington, D.C. The streak ended in the 79–67 loss to #4 Pittsburgh in the Backyard Brawl. WVU defeated St. John's, but then lost to #7 Louisville and #20 Syracuse back-to-back. The Mountaineers ended the losing streak with an 86–59 win over Providence, but then lost to #4 Pitt for the second time.

West Virginia followed the loss to Pitt with a 93–72 victory over #13 Villanova, featuring Da'Sean Butler's career-high 43 point performance. The Mountaineers then defeated Notre Dame and Rutgers before losing to Cincinnati 70–59 in Huggins' return to Cincinnati. The Mountaineers bounced back with consecutive wins against USF and DePaul, but lost to #6 Louisville 62–59 in Morgantown while hosting College GameDay. Having finished the regular season at 21–10 (10–8), West Virginia earned a first round bye in the 2009 Big East tournament, and opened the second round of play with a 74–62 victory over Notre Dame. In the quarterfinals round, West Virginia defeated #2 Pittsburgh 74–60. The Mountaineers then lost a semifinal game to Syracuse in overtime, 74–69. Syracuse was fresh off the heels of a six overtime victory against Connecticut, the longest game in Big East history. WVU earned a #6 seed in the NCAA tournament and played their first-round game against the #11 seed Dayton Flyers. The season ended with a 68–60 loss to the Flyers.

Huggins' third season with the Mountaineers would prove to be one of the best in his career. During the 2009–10 season, West Virginia had a banner year, winning a school-record 31 games. WVU won the early season 76 Classic, defeating Long Beach State in the quarterfinals, Texas A&M in the semi-finals, and Portland in the championship round. The Mountaineers defeated a total of seven NCAA tournament teams throughout the season, including out-of-conference victories over aforementioned Texas A&M and Ohio State. Huggins' Mountaineers split the annual Backyard Brawl with Pitt, with each team winning on their home court. WVU finished the regular season with a 24–6 (13–5) record, tied for second (with No. 9 Villanova and No. 18 Pitt) in the Big East, behind only No. 4 Syracuse. This was WVU's highest regular season finish in their seventeen-year Big East tenure (1995–2012). The Mountaineers received a double-bye into the quarterfinals of the Big East tournament. WVU subsequently defeated Cincinnati, Notre Dame in the semi-finals, and the Georgetown Hoyas in the championship game to win their first and only Big East tournament title.

WVU received a #2 seed (their highest ever) in the NCAA Tournament in the East Region. Huggins' squad defeated #15 seed Morgan State in their First Round match-up, #10 seed Missouri in the second round, and the #11 seed Washington Huskies in the Sweet 16 round. This set the stage for an Elite Eight match-up between the Mountaineers and the #1 seed Kentucky Wildcats, coached by Huggins' long-time friend, John Calipari. In a hard-fought, back-and-forth contest, WVU ultimately persevered in a 73–66 victory which sent the Mountaineers to their second Final Four in school history.

On April 3, 2010, Duke, the #1 seed from the South, and the Mountaineers squared off in the second of the Final Four games. Duke showed its full potential in the game, hitting 52.7 percent of its shots (and 52 percent of its three-pointers) while shredding West Virginia's 1–3–1 zone trap. Duke led 39–31 at the half and maintained its red-hot shooting in the second half. After WVU lost star forward Da'Sean Butler, a Wooden award finalist, to a devastating knee injury, the defining play of the game came when Nolan Smith missed a contested, fast-break layup, but Kyle Singler and Miles Plumlee combined to slam home the rebound to give Duke a 14-point lead. Despite the Final Four loss, WVU finished their season with a 31–7 record, and ranked #3 in the final Coaches' Poll, and #6 in the AP Poll.

After earning just the second Final Four appearance in school history, Huggins entered WVU's 2010–11 season with more modest but still notable expectations. The Mountaineers were predicted to finish fifth out of sixteen in the regular season standings, behind Pitt, Villanova, Syracuse, and Georgetown. Forward junior Kevin Jones was also named to the 2010–11 Preseason All-Big East First Team. West Virginia opened nonconference play with an 8–2 record, with losses coming to Minnesota in the Puerto Rico Tip-Off championship game and at Miami. Despite starting 0–2 in conference play with losses to St. John's and Marquette, the Mountaineers rebounded to win seven of their next nine games, including wins over No. 13 Georgetown, and a nonconference matchup over No. 8 Purdue. However, then No. 21 WVU did lose their annual matchup with in-state Marshall in the Chesapeake Energy Capital Classic, in what would prove to be the Thundering Herd's only victory over a ranked opponent that season. It would also prove to be Huggins' only loss to Marshall during his ten meetings as Mountaineers' coach. Huggins later disputed the characterization of the matchup as a "rivalry" and mocked the notion that he was afraid of playing Marshall in subsequent years.

The Mountaineers began February and the second half of their conference slate sitting at 15–6 (6–3). However, West Virginia faced top 25 teams in seven of their nine final regular season matchups, and went 5–4 in games from February 5 to March 5, 2011. This stretch was highlighted by losses (at No. 12 Villanova, No. 4 Pitt, at No. 20 Syracuse, and at No. 6 Pitt) and some notable wins (No. 7 Notre Dame, No. 16 Uconn, and No. 11 Louisville). After a quick exit in the second round of the Big East tournament to Marquette, the Mountaineers earned an at-large bid to the NCAA tournament where they were seeded #5 and beat #11 seed Clemson in the second round. After the victory over the Tigers, Huggins and the Mountaineers found themselves matched up against John Calipiri and #4 seed / No. 11 Kentucky for the second straight tournament. West Virginia, which reached the Final Four a year prior by beating Kentucky in the regional final, led 41–33 after closing the opening half on a 22–7 run. But Kentucky scored the first 11 points coming out of the break and wore down the Mountaineers, winning 71–63. Calipiri and the Wildcats would later beat Ohio State and North Carolina before losing to the eventual champion UConn in the Final Four.

On December 22, 2011, Huggins reached his 700th career victory by defeating Missouri State, making him one of 4 active coaches in Division I college basketball to have earned more than 700 wins.

Following two disappointing seasons, one of which saw WVU make no postseason at all and the other ending with a loss in the first round of the NIT, Huggins and the Mountaineers bounced back in 2014–15, making the Sweet Sixteen before bowing out to Kentucky, who was the #1 overall seed and undefeated at the time.

In 2015–16, the team got off to a 15–1 start, including a 4–0 mark in the Big 12 and climbed as high as #6 in the AP Poll following a win over #1 Kansas. The Mountaineers were ranked for the final 16 weeks in the AP poll. The Mountaineers finished runner-up to the Jayhawks in the Big 12 and made it to the Big 12 tournament championship game before losing to KU. In the 2016 NCAA tournament, West Virginia was awarded a 3 seed, but its stay was short-lived as the 14th seeded Stephen F. Austin Lumberjacks knocked them off in the first round.

Similar to their previous season, WVU raced out to a 15–2 (4–1) start to begin the 2016–17 season, including winning the NIT Season Tip-Off and winning at No. 6 Virginia and at home against No. 1 Baylor. After losing back-to-back games against Oklahoma and Kansas State, WVU — then 15–4 (4–3) — would not lose more than one game in a row for the remainder of the season. The Mountaineers won nine of their final twelve regular season games to finish 24–7 (12–6), and tied for second place heading into the conference tournament. For the second consecutive season, WVU advanced to the Big 12 tournament championship game before losing to Iowa State. WVU earned a 4 seed in the 2017 NCAA tournament and notched wins against 13 seed Bucknell and 5 seed and 14th ranked Notre Dame to advance to the Sweet 16 for the third time since 2010. WVU's season ended after 1 seed and No. 2 ranked Gonzaga, who went on to finish as the NCAA runner up, hit a go-ahead 3-pointer with under a minute to play, winning 61–58.

After losing to No. 25 Texas A&M in the Armed Forces Classic, WVU began the 2017–18 season with a 15–1 (4–0) record, including winning the AdvoCare Invitational, and notching wins against No. 15 Virginia, and No. 7 Oklahoma. The Mountaineers then struggled for the remainder of January, losing five of their next six games, including losses to No. 8 Texas Tech, No. 10 Kansas, and Kentucky. Halfway through conference play, WVU sat at 16–6 (5–4) to begin February. The Mountaineers proceeded to win six of the final nine games of the regular season to finish 22–9 (11–7), and finish in second place in conference play for the third consecutive season. WVU beat Baylor and No. 14 Texas Tech before falling to No. 9 Kansas in the Mountaineers' third straight Big 12 Conference Championship appearance. Earning a 5 seed in the NCAA tournament, West Virginia beat 12 seed Murray State and 13 seed Marshall to advance to back-to-back Sweet 16 appearances and their third Sweet 16 in four seasons. The Mountaineers' win over Marshall was notable as the teams used to compete annually in the Chesapeake Energy Capital Classic, and marked the first-ever postseason meeting between the only two Division I men's basketball teams in West Virginia. The Mountaineers' season ended with a loss to 1 seed and 2nd ranked Villanova, who went on to win the national title ten days later.

Despite beginning the 2018–19 season ranked No. 13, West Virginia opened the season with losses in two of their first three contests before winning seven of their next nine games to sit at 8–4 heading into conference play. West Virginia proceeded to lose eight of their next nine games, with the sole win being a surprise upset over No. 7 Kansas. West Virginia fared only marginally better over the second half of conference play and finished the regular season at 12–19 (4–14), earning last place in Big 12 conference play for the first time ever. Despite finishing last in the conference, the Mountaineers upset Oklahoma and No. 7 Texas Tech to advance to the conference tournament semifinals. This led Huggins to tweet a video of himself—when he was the head coach of the Cincinnati Bearcats—emerging from a coffin to say, "Why all the long faces? We're not dead yet!". West Virginia lost to No. 17 Kansas in the semifinals the next day. Despite their 14–20 record, the Mountaineers were invited to the College Basketball Invitational, where they beat Grand Canyon in the first round before losing to Coastal Carolina in the quarterfinals. The team's 21 losses were the most in a season in school history.

After finishing last place in the Big 12 during the prior year, preseason Big 12 polls picked the Mountaineers to finish 5th in the 2019–20 conference standings and five star recruit Oscar Tshiebwe was selected as the Big 12 Preseason Freshman of the Year. West Virginia raced out to an 11–1 start through November and December, with their sole loss coming at St. John's. The 11–1 start included winning four contests as part of the Cancún Challenge, and beating No. 2 Ohio State. The Mountaineers continued their success at the beginning of conference play, winning six of their nine first conference games. This included victories over No. 22 Texas Tech and a non conference win over Missouri as part of the Big 12/SEC Challenge. However, the Mountaineers proceeded to lose six of their next seven conference games, including losses to No. 3 Kansas and at No. 1 Baylor. Their sole win over the seven games came against an Oklahoma State team that was 13–12 (3–9) at the time. The losing streak left the Mountaineers at 19–10 (7–9) entering the month of March and at risk of missing the NCAA tournament. However, West Virginia won their final two games, at Iowa State and against No. 4 Baylor, to finish the regular season 21–10 (9–9). This earned the Mountaineers a four-way tie for third place with Texas, Oklahoma, and Texas Tech, and trailing No. 1 Kansas and No. 5 Baylor. After tiebreakers, WVU was assigned the sixth seed in the Big 12 Conference tournament against 3 seed Oklahoma. However, the contest was not played due to the sudden arrival of the COVID-19 pandemic in the United States. The NCAA tournament and all postseason play was also cancelled, ending the Mountaineers' season.

After finishing the 2019–20 season in a four-way tie for third place, the Mountaineers entered the 2020–21 season selected to finish third, behind only Baylor and Kansas. Due to the ongoing COVID-19 pandemic, a number of non conference games were either postponed or cancelled, including the renewed Backyard Brawl against Pitt. The Mountaineers were also initially scheduled to compete in the 2020 Battle 4 Atlantis alongside perennial heavyweights Duke and Ohio State. However, the early season tournament was cancelled due to the pandemic. As a result, all of the teams, including WVU, were invited to compete in the first annual Crossover Classic at the Sanford Pentagon in Sioux Falls, South Dakota. As the tournament neared, South Dakota has had among the highest rates of new COVID-19 cases per-capita nationwide. A top draw of the tournament, Duke, immediately took a pass and was replaced by Dayton. The rest of the seven teams originally set to play in the Bahamas: Creighton, Ohio State, Texas A&M, Utah, West Virginia, Wichita State and Memphis reflected a combined 20 Final Fours and 70 Sweet 16 appearances. However, despite promising he would never go to South Dakota, Huggins and the Mountaineers were one of just two "original" teams to compete in the tournament. Creighton, Dayton, Ohio State, Texas A&M, Wichita State, and Utah all dropped out of the tournament prior to the event. In spite of the logistical chaos, WVU beat South Dakota State, VCU, and Western Kentucky in successive days to win the Crossover Classic. The Mountaineers finished an abbreviated non conference schedule at 6–1, with the sole mark coming in a five-point contest against No. 1 Gonzaga in the Jimmy V Classic. Despite their hot start in 2020–21, West Virginia was rocked by Oscar Tshiebwe's sudden announcement on New Year's Day that he was leaving the Mountaineers' program and would not return. Tshiebwe, who was picked as Big 12 Preseason Freshman of the Year and named to the Second Team All-Big 12 in the prior season, had averaged 8.5 points and 7.8 rebounds through the first 10 games of the 2020–21 season.

After Tshiebwe's departure, West Virginia opened conference play by alternating wins (Iowa State, Northeastern, Oklahoma State) and losses (No. 3 Kansas, Oklahoma, and No. 4 Texas) before two conference contests were postponed in mid-January due to COVID-19 issues. After trading wins and losses to begin conference play, the Mountaineers won five straight conference games at the end of January and beginning of February, including wins over No. 10 Texas Tech, No. 23 Kansas, and again at No. 7 Texas Tech. This put the Mountaineers at 14–5 (7–3) in mid-February before they dropped a 2OT contest to No. 12 Oklahoma, breaking the Mountaineers' five conference game winning streak. West Virginia finished the remainder of conference play 4–3, to finish the regular season at 18–8 (11–6), or tied for third place behind No. 3 Baylor and No. 12 Kansas. Due to additional coronavirus issues, West Virginia only played regular season winner Baylor in one game, rather than the traditional full conference round robin play, leaving the Mountaineers with 17 conference games, rather than 18. WVU lost in the quarterfinals of the Big 12 tournament to No. 12 Oklahoma State to begin postseason play. Reflecting the strength of the Big 12 and WVU's schedule, the Mountaineers were selected as a 3 seed for an at-large bid to the NCAA tournament, tied with the 2016–17 season for WVU's second highest ever seeding. On the back of a season-high 30 points from sophomore Miles McBride, West Virginia defeated 14 seed Morehead State in the tournament before losing in a three-point upset to Jim Boeheim's Syracuse Orange in the second round. After the season, McBride declared for the 2021 NBA draft where he was selected in the second round and quickly traded to the New York Knicks. The Mountaineers' win over Morehead State was also Bob Huggins' 900th career victory.

The Mountaineers were selected by coaches to finish fifth (out of tenth) in the Big 12 preseason poll to open the 2021–22 season, behind Kansas, Texas, Baylor, and Texas Tech. West Virginia opened the season at 4–1, with a win over Pitt in the Backyard Brawl and taking two out of three contests in the Charleston Classic. On November 18, 2021, Huggins earned his 903rd career victory by defeating Elon in the quarterfinals of the Classic, passing Bob Knight all-time among Division I coaches and tying Roy Williams, who retired in April with the fourth-most wins. Despite a semifinal loss to Marquette in-between, just three days after tying Roy Williams, Huggins passed Williams altogether when the Mountaineers beat Clemson. Upon passing Williams in career wins, Huggins remarked, "I’m not going to quit until I beat Roy in something." However, the Mountaineers didn't fare well in Big 12 play, posting a last place mark with a 4–14 record. WVU was given the 9-seed in the 2022 Big 12 men's basketball tournament, where they defeated Kansas State 73–67 in the preliminary round and lost 63–87 to Kansas in the next day's quarterfinal round. Huggins was given two technical fouls and ejected from the game with 9:59 in the first half after fiercely disputing a technical foul called on Taz Sherman. 

Huggins is the second-winningest coach in WVU history, behind only fellow Hall of Famer Gale Catlett.

Head coaching record

Coaching tree 
Several former assistant coaches of Huggins have gone on to their own careers in coaching.
 Jerrod Calhoun: Fairmont State (2012–2017), Youngstown State (2017–present)
 Mick Cronin: Cincinnati (2006–2019), UCLA (2020–present)
 Larry Harrison: Hartford (2000–2006)
 Andy Kennedy: Cincinnati (2005–2006), Ole Miss (2006–2018), UAB (2020–present)
 John Loyer: Wabash Valley CC (1999–2000)
 Frank Martin: Kansas State (2007–2012), South Carolina (2012–2022), UMass (2022–present)
 Brad Underwood: Stephen F. Austin (2013–2016), Oklahoma State (2016–2017), Illinois (2017–present)
 Darris Nichols: Radford (2021–present)
 Erik Martin: South Carolina State (2022–present)
 Joe Mazzulla: NBA Boston Celtics (2022–present)

See also
 List of college men's basketball coaches with 600 wins
 List of NCAA Division I Men's Final Four appearances by coach

References

External links

 profile

1953 births
Living people
Akron Zips men's basketball coaches
American men's basketball players
Basketball coaches from West Virginia
Basketball players from West Virginia
Cincinnati Bearcats men's basketball coaches
Kansas State Wildcats men's basketball coaches
Ohio Bobcats men's basketball players
Ohio State Buckeyes men's basketball coaches
People from Port Washington, Ohio
Point guards
Sportspeople from Morgantown, West Virginia
UCF Knights men's basketball coaches
Walsh Cavaliers men's basketball coaches
West Virginia Mountaineers men's basketball coaches
West Virginia Mountaineers men's basketball players